The first season of Taking The Stage premiered on March 19, 2009 and after an eight-month hiatus, the season finale aired January 17, 2010. It followed five kids who attend SCPA on the cusp of greatness. The finale aired in cahoots with the Season 2 premier.

Cast

The following is a list of cast members presents in this season.

  Main Cast Member
  Secondary Cast Member

Main Cast Bios
Tyler Nelson- A dance major and the only junior part of the season one main cast. His specialty is Hip-hop dance but with enrolling in SCPA he has to take ballet classes. He is a ladies man and early in the season he gets romantically involved with Jasmine, although then he also gets involved with Mia, creating friction with him and Jasmine and they eventually break up. He also starts a rivalry with Malik, whose crew inspired him to create his own crew, Black Rain, and do it his way since he didn't like Malik's choreography. He is  given an audition for Bloc Agency along with Malik and is accepted, but his parents and ballet teacher convince him to finish high school first, with his teacher remarking "If they like you this year, they will love you next year." He returns in season two as a senior
Mia Carruthers- A senior and vocal music major and the only white person of the show's main cast. Mia is an aspiring songwriter whose dream is to be signed to a record label before she turns eighteen. She came close to achieving that dream when the head of Jive Records who was at the talent show at the beginning of the year asked her to send him a few of her songs, but after that she was rejected by the label. She also became involved with Tyler Nelson which caused problems between her, Jasmine (Tyler's girlfriend at the time), and Aaron (Mia's friend who has a crush on her). At the end of the first season she moves in with her band which includes her brother and Aaron. She returns in season two as a new teacher for a songwriting class.
Jasmine White-Killins- A senior and Dance major who is regarded as one of the top ballerinas in the school. She dreams of going to Juilliard for college, but is rejected and instead goes to Alvin Alley, where she is forced to choose between choosing a dance curriculum or an academic one. She is a member of Malik's dance crew 'The Definition', and is best friends with him and Shaakira. She is also romantically involved with Tyler at the start of the season. She ultimately chooses to attend Southern Methodist University in Dallas, TX.
Malik Kitchen- A senior and Dance major who wishes to be a star on Broadway. He is openly gay and has an on/off boyfriend in Matthew. He is a rival to Tyler. His closest friends are Shaakira and Jasmine, who are also in his dance crew. Along with Tyler, Malik gets an audition for the Bloc Agency, which he is rejected by because his dancing was "too perfect". Malik also sings, and performs in a showcase of artists impressions on "Top 40" songs.
Shaakira Sargent- A senior and dance major. She is a member of the Definition with Malik and Jasmine and their best friend. Compared to the other major cast members, Shaakira gets very little screen time and only big part in the series is when she gets a role in the school ballet.

Episodes

References

External links
Season 1 on MTV

2009 American television seasons
2010 American television seasons